William Cassidy (30 June 1917 – 1962) was an English footballer who played as a wing half.

Cassidy started his career with non-league Close Works before signing for Gateshead in January 1936. He scored a total of 6 goals in 138 appearances in league and cup competitions for Gateshead before his retirement in 1953.

Career statistics

External links

1917 births
English footballers
Association football wing halves
Gateshead F.C. players
English Football League players
1962 deaths
Footballers from Gateshead